Twin Mountain may refer to a location in the United States:

Twin Mountain, New Hampshire, a village in Grafton County
The Twin Mountains, a pair of summits in the White Mountains:
South Twin Mountain (New Hampshire)
North Twin Mountain (New Hampshire)
 Twin Mountain (Greene County, New York), a summit in the Catskill Mountains